Association fibers are axons that connect cortical areas within the same cerebral hemisphere.

In human neuroanatomy, axons (nerve fibers) within the brain, can be categorized on the basis of their course and connections as association fibers, projection fibers, and commissural fibers.

The association fibers unite different parts of the same cerebral hemisphere, and are of two kinds: (1) short association fibers that connect adjacent gyri; (2) long association fibers that make connections between more distant parts.

Short association fibers
Many of the short association fibers (also called arcuate or "U"-fibers) lie immediately beneath the gray substance of the cortex of the hemispheres, and connect together adjacent gyri. Some pass from one wall of the sulcus to the other.

Long association fibers
The long association fibers connect the more widely separated gyri and are grouped into bundles. They include the following:

Diffusion tensor imaging is a non-invasive method to study the course of association fibers.

See also
 Interneuron
 Tractography

References

External links
 
 

Cerebral white matter